Chicago, Illinois to Los Angeles, California

Results

References

American Solar Challenge